State Route 399 (SR 399) is an  state highway in Pershing County, Nevada. It connects Eagle-Picher Mine to Lovelock, the nearest town.

Route description

SR 399's west terminus is at the entrance to Eagle-Picher Mine, which mines diatomite. SR 399 continues northeast and intersects Seven Troughs Road. SR 399 goes southwest on Seven Troughs Road until it meets SR 854, where it becomes Pitt Road. Pitt Road continues east until it meets North Meridian Road/SR 398 north of Lovelock.

History
SR 399 was established on July 1, 1976.

Major intersections

See also

References

399
Transportation in Pershing County, Nevada